José Luiz Plein Filho known as José Luiz Plein (born 25 April 1951 in Santa Maria, Rio Grande do Sul) is a retired Brazilian professional football player, who played as offensive midfielder and currently manager.

Career as a player
Began in the Inter de Santa Maria and served in other gauchos teams: Grêmio (where he was champion of Gaucho and champion of Brazil in 1981), Caxias, Juventude, Esportivo, Bento Gonçalves, Brasil de Farroupilha, Glória de Vacaria, where he finished his career in 1988. With Coritiba he was triple champion of Paraná in 1974-76.

Career as a manager
Since 2003 he coached the Juventude, Glória, Grêmio, Criciúma and Guarani-VA.

References

External links
 Profile at futebolcia.com.br

1951 births
Living people
People from Santa Maria, Rio Grande do Sul
Association football midfielders
Brazilian footballers
Esporte Clube Internacional players
Coritiba Foot Ball Club players
Esporte Clube Juventude players
Grêmio Foot-Ball Porto Alegrense players
Sociedade Esportiva e Recreativa Caxias do Sul players
Clube Esportivo Bento Gonçalves players
Sociedade Esportiva Recreativa e Cultural Brasil players
Grêmio Esportivo Glória players
Brazilian football managers
Esporte Clube Juventude managers
Grêmio Esportivo Glória managers
Grêmio Foot-Ball Porto Alegrense managers
Criciúma Esporte Clube managers
Esporte Clube Guarani managers
Sportspeople from Rio Grande do Sul